S. Eugene Poteat (born 1930, died 2022) was a retired senior Central Intelligence Agency executive.  He was awarded the CIA's Intelligence Medal of Merit and the National Reconnaissance Office Meritorious Civilian Award.  He was President of AFIO - the Association of Former Intelligence Officers for fifteen years, retiring in 2014, and appointed AFIO's President-emeritus in 2015. He previously served on the Board of Advisors of the International Spy Museum. He is currently Professor Emeritus at the Institute of World Politics in Washington, D.C., teaching a course on "Technology, Intelligence, Security, and Statecraft".

He graduated from The Citadel (military college) with a B.S. in Electrical Engineering in 1957, and holds a master's degree in Statecraft and National Security Affairs with a specialization in Intelligence Studies from the Institute of World Politics in Washington, D.C., and was awarded a LL.D. in 2010 for his service to intelligence education and to the profession. He has also taken postdoc courses in foreign policy, national security, and intelligence at Cambridge University.

After college he worked for Bell Telephone Laboratories in New Jersey and Cape Canaveral.

He joined the CIA in 1960, and worked there for 30 years, also serving abroad in London and Scandinavia.

He was a participant in the Gulf of Tonkin Incident.
In the Fall of 1999, he wrote that he was asked in early August 1964 to determine if the radar operator's report showed a real torpedo boat attack or an imagined one.  He asked for further details on time, weather and surface conditions.  No further details were forthcoming.  In the end he concluded that there were no torpedo boats on the night in question, and that the White House was interested only in confirmation of an attack, not that there was no such attack.

He was a program manager for the sensors on the Lockheed U-2 and the Lockheed A-12 OXCART.

He has written about intelligence problems in the AFIO newsletter, its Intelligencer Journal and for "The Guide to the Study of Intelligence". He was written about in Wired Magazine, and in a book about CIA science and technology.

He received an honorary doctorate from the Institute of World Politics in Washington, DC in 2010.

He is a 32nd degree Freemason, a member of the Dorchester Lodge No. 369 of North Charleston, South Carolina, and a member of the Scottish Rite Bodies of Charleston.

He died on May 22, 2002.

References

External links
 Prof. Poteat comments on Polish plane crash in Tygodnik Solidarnosc: "Russian Image Management -- Making Unpleasant Historical Truths About Poland Disappear".
  Institute of World Politics

1930s births
Living people
People of the Central Intelligence Agency
People from North Charleston, South Carolina
The Institute of World Politics faculty